The St Helena Tunnel is a twin-tube road tunnel that forms part of the Pacific Highway near , New South Wales, Australia. The  tunnel under St Helena Hill in the locality of Ewingsdale was built as part of the  Tintenbar to Ewingsdale upgrade, which involved a new alignment of the highway.

Features
The tunnel was built to avoid the steep grades of St Helena Hill on the previous alignment of the highway, and the associated heavy truck noise and pollution. There are two tunnels, with the northbound tunnel accommodating two traffic lanes and the southbound three traffic lanes, due to the gradient of the highway at this point. There is also a bicycle/pedestrian lane in each tunnel.

The cost of the Tintenbar-Ewingsdale upgrade project was $862 million, jointly funded by the New South Wales and Federal governments. It opened on 18 December 2015. The remaining tie-in work at each end was completed in March 2016.

Milestones
 January 2010 - Planning approval and construction funding for the Tintenbar to Ewingsdale project including the St Helena Tunnel
 May 2010 - NSW Roads and Maritime Services called for expressions of interest for the construction of the upgrade
 December 2010 - three companies were invited to submit detailed tenders
 August 2011 - the contract was awarded to Lend Lease (previously Baulderstone)
27 September 2012 - the shovel ceremony was held to commemorate the start of construction
28 May 2013 - Blasting began on the twin tunnels
24 January 2014 - Excavator broke through on the northbound tunnel
26 February 2014 - Excavator broke through on the southbound tunnel
December 2015 - Commissioning of tunnels began
18 December 2015 - The highway upgrade, including the twin tunnels, opened to traffic

Gallery

See also

List of tunnels in Australia
Pacific Highway (Australia)

References

External links
 Pacific Highway Tintenbar to Ewingsdale Upgrade at RMS website

Tunnels in New South Wales
Northern Rivers
Pacific Highway (Australia)
Road tunnels in Australia